TASIS Portugal, formally known as The American School in Portugal, is a private American international school in Portugal. It is the newest of the four TASIS Schools, a Swiss group of American international schools.

Located in Linhó, Sintra, on the Portuguese Riviera, the school enrolls pupils from around the world.

History
The fourth of the TASIS Schools, TASIS Portugal was established in 2020. 

Its campus was founded within the Quinta da Beloura in Linhó, Sintra, an affluent village on the Portuguese Riviera, west of Lisbon.

Academics
Elementary and middle students follow the Core Knowledge Foundation curriculum. The high school, currently under development, will have an International Baccalaureate program.

All students are required to wear school uniforms.

Administration
TASIS Portugal is a member of the TASIS Schools, four international boarding schools that are jointly-owned by the TASIS Foundation. Apart from the TASIS Foundation's board of directors, each school is governed by its own board of directors. Fernando González is both Chairman of TASIS Portugal and TASIS England, as well as a member of the Foundation's board. Keith Chicquen is the headmaster of TASIS Portugal.

TASIS Portugal is accredited by Council of International Schools (CIS).

References

External links

 TASIS Portugal official website

TASIS
International Baccalaureate schools in Portugal
International schools in Lisbon
Portugal
Educational institutions established in 2020
2020 establishments in Portugal
Education in Sintra